Aulo Lemuel Gustafsson (5 December 1908 – 19 August 1982) was a Swedish freestyle swimmer who competed in the 1928 Summer Olympics. He was born and died in Stockholm.

In the 1928 he was a member of the Swedish team which finished fifth in the 4×200 m freestyle relay event.

External links

1908 births
1982 deaths
Swedish male freestyle swimmers
Olympic swimmers of Sweden
Swimmers at the 1928 Summer Olympics
European Aquatics Championships medalists in swimming
Swimmers from Stockholm
20th-century Swedish people